Deol is a Jat surname native to the Punjab region of India.

People with this surname include:

 Rupan Deol Bajaj, Indian bureaucrat
 Abhay Deol, Indian actor
 Bobby Deol, Indian actor
 Esha Deol, Indian actor
 Harita Kaur Deol, Indian Air Force pilot
 Monika Deol, Indo-Canadian television personality
 Ranjeev Deol, Indo-Canadian hockey player
 Sonia Deol, British-Indian radio and television presenter
 Sunny Deol, Indian actor
 Dharmendra (born Dharam Singh Deol), Indian actor
 Harleen Deol, Indian cricketer

References

Indian surnames
Hindu surnames
Jat clans of Punjab
Punjabi-language surnames
Punjabi tribes